The 1970 Stockholm Open was a tennis tournament played on hard courts and part of the 1970 Pepsi-Cola Grand Prix and took place in Stockholm, Sweden. The tournament was held from November 1 through November 7, 1970. Stan Smith won in the final by beating Arthur Ashe 5–7, 6–4, 6–4.

Seeds

  Ken Rosewall (semifinal)
  Arthur Ashe (final)

Draw

Finals

Top half

Bottom half

References

1970 Singles
1970 Grand Prix (tennis)